The Candy Snatchers is a 1973 American exploitation crime film directed by Guerdon Trueblood. The film was unofficially inspired by the kidnapping of Barbara Jane Mackle. It stars Susan Sennett as a teenager who is kidnapped and held for ransom by three amateur criminals. The picture gained cult film status and received a DVD release in 2005 through Subversive Cinema.

Plot 
Candy (Susan Sennett) is a 16-year-old girl who gets kidnapped on her way home from her Catholic school. The three kidnappers include Eddy (Vince Martorano), his partner Jessie (Tiffany Bolling) and Jessie's brother Alan (Brad David). After taking her in their van and tying her up, they bury her alive in a Southern California field. They give her a pipe for air, expecting they will soon gain a ransom from her father. Unbeknownst to them, Sean Newton (Christopher Trueblood) - an autistic young boy living nearby - witnesses their crime. He returns home and tries to tell his intolerant parents - Dudley (Jerry Butts) and Audrey (Bonnie Boland) - about what he saw.

The kidnappers contact Candy's father, Avery Phillips (Ben Piazza), demanding that he pay her ransom with all the diamonds in his jewelry store. However, Avery stays put and doesn't report the abduction to anyone, including Candy's mother Katherine (Dolores Dorn).

The kidnappers dig Candy up and bring her to their hideout. Jessie and Alan intend to remove Candy's ear to present to Avery as leverage, but Eddy prevents this. Jessie and Alan visit the morgue, where they bribe the coroner Charlie (Bill Woodard) to remove an ear from a cadaver. Meanwhile, Eddy and Candy bond, with the former promising the latter that he will not let anyone do harm to her. After Jessie and Alan return to the hideout, Eddy rapes Jessie, who shows signs of mental illness.

Eddy presents the ear to the unmoved Avery, who reveals that Candy is his stepdaughter and that she is set to inherit $2 million from her late father when she turns 21 - if she dies before then, he will receive half her inheritance. Alan heads to the hideout to kill Candy. Sean infiltrates the hideout and discovers Candy, who tells him to contact the police. Alan returns and rapes her. Eddy interrupts the assault and beats Alan. Sean escapes unseen. But when he goes home, he misunderstands Candy's instructions and uses a police doll to call a Jewish deli in Brooklyn.

Jessie and Alan insist that Candy must die. In the night, Eddy takes Candy to the grave, promising to return and save her. The next morning, he tells Alan he killed her. As Sean watches them drive off, he tries to sneak back with a pair of scissors. However, his mother catches him and gives him a downer to keep him quiet.

The kidnappers visit Katherine, who becomes intoxicated and is seduced by Alan. The kidnappers have Katherine call Avery, who is having an affair with his employee Lisa (Phyllis Major). Avery returns home, where he is held at gunpoint by the kidnappers while Alan murders Katherine.

Avery leads the kidnappers to the jewelry store, where he delivers to them the contents of the safe. Avery fails to retrieve his revolver. Alan attempts to shoot Eddy, who kills him. Eddy and Jessie try to escape, but Avery kills Jessie and pursues Eddy to the grave site. They have a gunfight that ends with Avery's death.

Eddy attempts to dig Candy up, but Sean shoots him dead with Avery's gun. Sean listens to Candy's breathing through the pipe. Audrey calls Sean with a cowbell, prompting him to make a trail to his house by sliding down the hill on his backside. Then a gunshot is heard, followed by the sound of the cowbell dropping and Candy's breathing in her underground prison. Her final fate remains unknown.

Cast

Tiffany Bolling as Jessie
Ben Piazza as Avery Philips
Susan Sennett as Candy Philips
Brad David as Alan
Vince Martorano as Eddy
Bonnie Boland as Audrey Newton
Jerry Butts as Dudley Newton
Leon Charles as Boss
Dolores Dorn as Katherine Philips
Phyllis Major as Lisa
Bill Woodard as Charlie
Christopher Trueblood (as Christophe) as Sean Newton
Earl Hansen as Gun Store Owner
Harry Kronman as Deli Owner
John Bill as Policeman
James Whitworth as Phone Man
Howard Shoup as Jewellery Store Salesman
Rosella Kronman as Boss' Wife
Alan DeWitt as Priest
Diana Vaughan Read as Nun

Reception
Actress Tiffany Bolling has stated that she later came to regret making the film and that she had only done it for a paycheck. She further commented that "I was doing cocaine...and I didn't really know what I was doing, and I was very angry about the way that my career had gone in the industry...the opportunities that I had and had not been given.... The hardest thing for me, as I look back on it, was I had done a television series, The New People, and so I had a lot of young people who really respected me and... revered me as something of a hero, and then I came out with this stupid Candy Snatchers movie... It was a horrendous experience."

Critical reception for the film has been positive. It currently holds a rating of 83% on Rotten Tomatoes based on 6 reviews, with a weighted average of 6.38/10. DVD Talk gave a positive review for the 2005 DVD release, citing the disc's extras as a highlight. Bloody Disgusting gave a more mixed review and gave the film three out of five skulls.

References

External links
 

1973 films
1970s exploitation films
Films about child abduction in the United States
Films about rape
Films about autism
1970s crime thriller films
American exploitation films
1970s English-language films
1970s American films